Jean De Herdt (22 July 1923 - 5 January 2013) was a French judoka. De Herdt was the first french student of famed Judo master Mikinosuke Kawaishi. He was a two time gold European Judo Championships medalists.

References

External links
 

1923 births
2013 deaths
People from Paris
French male judoka
Recipients of the Legion of Honour
20th-century French people